Phoenix Amongst The Ashes is the fifth album by the band Hate Eternal, released on May 10, 2011. Frontman Erik Rutan commented that "the band has come up with one of [their] heaviest, most twisted, evil, melodic, and insane albums yet". The album was recorded in MANA Recording Studios.

Track list

Personnel
 Erik Rutan - guitars, vocals
 JJ Hrubovcak - bass
 Jade Simonetto - drums

References

2011 albums
Hate Eternal albums
Metal Blade Records albums
Albums produced by Erik Rutan